Ivan Ivanov is a former Soviet Olympic middle-distance runner. He represented the Soviet Union in the 1972 Summer Olympics.

References 

1948 births
Living people
Olympic athletes of the Soviet Union
Athletes (track and field) at the 1972 Summer Olympics
Soviet male middle-distance runners